Garcinia nitida, also known as kandis hutan, is a species of flowering plant, a dioecious understorey fruit tree in the mangosteen family, that is native to Southeast Asia.

Description
The tree grows to 30 m in height, with a 2–6 m bole and small fluted buttresses. The smooth oval leaves are 6–10 cm long by 3–4 cm wide. The white to cream flowers are 4-petalled. The fruits are oval berries, 3–4 cm by 2.5–3 cm in diameter, ripening from yellow to pale orange, enclosing light brown seeds covered with a translucent, edible, sour arillode.

Distribution and habitat
The species is endemic to Borneo, where it is found in lowland and hill mixed dipterocarp forest up to an elevation of 900 m.

Usage
The species is not commonly cultivated. The sour rind and pulp of the fruits are used as a substitute for tamarind in condiments with cooked rice, fish and curries, as well as in jam and sweetened drinks.

References

 
nitida
Endemic flora of Borneo
Fruits originating in Asia
Plants described in 1883
Taxa named by Jean Baptiste Louis Pierre